{{DISPLAYTITLE:C24H14}}
The molecular formula C24H14 (molar mass: 302.37 g/mol, exact mass: 302.1096 u) may refer to:

 Dibenzopyrenes
 Zethrene, or dibenzo[de,mn]naphthacene